The William E. Boeing House is a historic mansion located in the gated community of The Highlands in Shoreline, Washington.

Description and history 
The house is named after William Boeing, the founder of The Boeing Company, who named it Aldarra. Located at the edge of a wooded bluff overlooking Puget Sound, it was completed in 1914, and was designed by Charles Bebb in the Mediterranean Revival style with a white stucco façade and red tile roof, and eight fireplaces.

Boeing occupied the house from its completion until 1954, when he moved to his country estate near Fall City, Washington, and donated the property to Children's Orthopedic Hospital, now known as Seattle Children's. The hospital sold the property to J. Elroy McCaw shortly after acquiring it, and it was sold again after McCaw's death in 1969.

The house is listed on the National Register of Historic Places. It is a private residence and not open to the public.

See also
 National Register of Historic Places listings in King County, Washington

References

External links
 William E. Boeing House with picture at the National Park Service

1914 establishments in Washington (state)
Houses completed in 1914
Houses in King County, Washington
Houses on the National Register of Historic Places in Washington (state)
Mediterranean Revival architecture in the United States
National Register of Historic Places in King County, Washington
Shoreline, Washington